A scutum is a design of Roman shield.

Scutum may also refer to:

 Scutum (constellation)
 Scute, a zootomical term
 Scutum, a sharp bony spur at Prussak's space of the ear